White Friday (CM9) is the twentieth and first retail mixtape by American rapper Yo Gotti. It released on December 23, 2016 by Collective Music Group, Roc Nation and Epic Records . The mixtape features guest appearances from LunchMoney Lewis, Kodak Black, YFN Lucci, DJ Khaled, Kanye West, Big Sean, 2 Chainz, Quavo, and Blac Youngsta The mixtape is supported by the singles "Castro" featuring Kanye West, Big Sean, 2 Chainz, and Quavo, "Weatherman" featuring Kodak Black, and "Blah Blah Blah".

Track listing

Notes
 "Power of Money" features vocals from Ink.
 "I Remember" contains elements from "Come On Down (Get Your Head Out Of The Clouds)" written by Greg Perry and Angelo Bond, performed by Greg Perry.

Charts

References

2016 mixtape albums
Yo Gotti albums
Epic Records albums
Albums produced by Southside (record producer)